All That We Let In is the ninth studio album by the Indigo Girls, released in 2004. The cover art is by alternative comics artist Jaime Hernandez of Love and Rockets fame.

The album was released in two versions: a single-disc, audio-only version and a CD+DVD version containing a 30-minute, bonus DVD with 6 songs.

Track listing
"Fill It Up Again" (Emily Saliers) – 3:49
"Heartache for Everyone" (Amy Ray) – 3:15
"Free in You" (Saliers) – 3:47
"Perfect World" (Ray) – 3:36
"All That We Let In" (Saliers) – 4:40
"Tether" (Ray) – 6:15
"Come On Home" (Saliers) – 4:41
"Dairy Queen" (Ray) – 3:49
"Something Real" (Saliers) – 4:09
"Cordova" (Ray) – 3:47
"Rise Up" (Saliers) – 4:10

Track listing – Bonus DVD
"Dairy Queen"
"Fill It Up Again"
"Come On Home"
"Perfect World"
"Galileo"
"Kid Fears"

References

External links
 

2004 albums
Indigo Girls albums
Epic Records albums
Albums produced by Peter Collins (record producer)